Trifurcula oishiella is a moth of the family Nepticulidae. It was described by Shōnen Matsumura in 1931. It is known from the main Japanese island of Honshu.

The larvae form galls in Prunus species.

References

Nepticulidae
Moths of Japan
Taxa named by Shōnen Matsumura
Moths described in 1931